Prunus × blireiana (or blireana), the purple-leafed plum or double-flowering plum, is an ornamental flowering plant hybrid in the genus Prunus. It is a cross between the Japanese apricot (Prunus mume) and the purple-leaved plum cultivar Prunus cerasifera 'Pissardii'.

The blossom is followed by reddish-purple tinged leaves which turn green as the season progresses.

References

blireiana
Ornamental plant cultivars
Hybrid prunus